Dimorphopalpa is a genus of moths belonging to the family Tortricidae.

Species
Dimorphopalpa albopunctana Brown, 1999
Dimorphopalpa lyonsae Razowski & Pelz, 2007
Dimorphopalpa rutruncus Razowski & Pelz, 2007
Dimorphopalpa striatana Brown, 1999
Dimorphopalpa striatanoides Brown, 1999
Dimorphopalpa teutoniana Brown, 1999
Dimorphopalpa xestochalca (Meyrick, 1926)

See also
List of Tortricidae genera

References

 , 2005, World Catalogue of Insects 5
 , 1999, Pan-Pacif. Ent. 75: 82.
 
 , 2009: Tortricidae (Lepidoptera) from the mountains of Ecuador and remarks on their geographical distribution. Part IV. Eastern Cordillera. Acta Zoologica Cracoviensia 51B (1-2): 119–187. doi:10.3409/azc.52b_1-2.119-187. Full article:  .

External links
tortricidae.com

Euliini
Tortricidae genera